Moritaka (written:  or ) is a masculine Japanese given name. Notable people with the name include:

 (1561–1584), Japanese samurai and daimyō
Moritaka Hayashi, Japanese lawyer
 (1573–1632), Japanese samurai

Moritaka is also a Japanese surname. Notable people with the surname include:

, Japanese model and actress
, Japanese singer-songwriter

Japanese-language surnames
Japanese masculine given names